Events from the year 1963 in Canada.

Incumbents

Crown 
 Monarch – Elizabeth II

Federal government 
 Governor General – Georges Vanier
 Prime Minister – John Diefenbaker (until April 22) then Lester B. Pearson
 Chief Justice – Patrick Kerwin (Ontario) (until 2 February) then Robert Taschereau (Quebec)
 Parliament – 25th (until 6 February) then 26th (from 16 May)

Provincial governments

Lieutenant governors 
Lieutenant Governor of Alberta – John Percy Page   
Lieutenant Governor of British Columbia – George Pearkes 
Lieutenant Governor of Manitoba – Errick Willis 
Lieutenant Governor of New Brunswick – Joseph Leonard O'Brien  
Lieutenant Governor of Newfoundland – Campbell Leonard Macpherson (until March 1) then Fabian O'Dea 
Lieutenant Governor of Nova Scotia – Edward Chester Plow (until March 1) then Henry Poole MacKeen  
Lieutenant Governor of Ontario – John Keiller MacKay (until May 1) then William Earl Rowe 
Lieutenant Governor of Prince Edward Island – Frederick Walter Hyndman (until August 1) then Willibald Joseph MacDonald 
Lieutenant Governor of Quebec – Paul Comtois 
Lieutenant Governor of Saskatchewan – Frank Lindsay Bastedo (until March 1) then Robert Hanbidge

Premiers 
Premier of Alberta – Ernest Manning   
Premier of British Columbia – W.A.C. Bennett 
Premier of Manitoba – Dufferin Roblin  
Premier of New Brunswick – Louis Robichaud 
Premier of Newfoundland – Joey Smallwood 
Premier of Nova Scotia – Robert Stanfield 
Premier of Ontario – John Robarts 
Premier of Prince Edward Island – Walter Shaw 
Premier of Quebec – Jean Lesage  
Premier of Saskatchewan – Woodrow Lloyd

Territorial governments

Commissioners 
 Commissioner of Yukon – Gordon Robertson Cameron
 Commissioner of Northwest Territories – Robert Gordon Robertson (until July 12) then Bent Gestur Sivertz

Events
February 4: Defence Minister Douglas Harkness resigns after Prime Minister Diefenbaker refuses to accept nuclear weapons from the United States
February 5: The Diefenbaker government collapses over the Bomarc Missile Crisis and an election is called
March 1: Simon Fraser University is founded
April 8: Federal election: Lester Pearson's Liberals win a minority, defeating John Diefenbaker's PCs
April 9: Canadian Recording Industry Association is established
April 20: The Front de libération du Québec sets off its first bombs in Quebec
April 22: Lester Pearson becomes Prime Minister, replacing John Diefenbaker
May 27: The Northern Alberta Institute of Technology opens
June 17: 1963 Alberta general election: Ernest Manning's Alberta Social Credit Party wins an eighth consecutive majority
July 22: The Royal Commission on Bilingualism and Biculturalism is announced
September 21: Place des Arts opens in Montreal
September 25: 1963 Ontario general election: John Robarts's PCs win a sixth consecutive majority
November 29: 118 are killed in the Trans-Canada Air Lines Flight 831 crash near Sainte-Thérèse, Quebec
December 23: plans to build the National Arts Centre are approved

Arts and literature

New Works
W.L. Morton: The Kingdom of Canada
Milton Acorn: Jawbreakers
Leonard Cohen: The Favorite Game
Farley Mowat: Never Cry Wolf

Awards
See 1963 Governor General's Awards for a complete list of winners and finalists for those awards.
Stephen Leacock Award: Donald Jack, Three Cheers for Me
Vicky Metcalf Award: Kerry Wood

Sport
March 16 – The McMaster Marlins win the first University Cup by defeating the UBC Thunderbirds 3 to 2 at the Kingston Memorial Centre 
April 18 – The Toronto Maple Leafs win their 11th Stanley Cup by defeating the Detroit Red Wings. The deciding Game 5 is played at Maple Leaf Gardens in Toronto
April 22  – Winnipeg awarded the 1967 Pan Am Games
May 11 – The Central Alberta Hockey League's Edmonton Oil Kings win their First Memorial Cup by defeating Ontario Hockey Association's Niagara Falls Flyers 4 games to 2. All games were played at Edmonton Gardens.
November 30 – The Hamilton Tiger-Cats win their third Grey Cup by defeating the BC Lions 21–10 in the 51st Grey Cup played Empire Stadium in Vancouver.

Births

January to March
January 1 – Cheryl Dick, netball player
January 9 – Larry Cain, sprint canoer and Olympic gold medallist
January 12 – Ken Fitzpatrick, swimmer
January 19 – Steve Peters, politician and Minister
January 25 – Paul Dewar, educator and politician (d. 2019) 
February 12 – Ron Schuler, politician
February 21 – Lori Fung, rhythmic gymnast
March 1 – Ron Francis, ice hockey player and coach
March 17 – Lawrence Ytzhak Braithwaite, novelist, spoken word artist, dub poet, essayist and musician (d.2008)
March 26 – Roch Voisine, singer-songwriter, actor and radio and television host
March 28 – Sharon Hambrook, synchronized swimmer
March 30
Wayne Gordon, boxer
Carol Klimpel, swimmer

April to June

April 4
Vince Ditrich, rock musician
Dale Hawerchuk, ice hockey player
Jim Wilson, politician
April 14 – John Kalbhenn, boxer
April 17 – Penny & Vicky Vilagos, synchronized swimmers
April 18 – Eric McCormack, actor, musician, writer and producer
April 27 – Joe Peschisolido, politician and businessman
April 27 – Cali Timmins, actress

April 28 – Lloyd Eisler, pair skater
May 5 – Susan Whelan, politician and Minister
May 9 – Joe Cirella, ice hockey player and coach
May 17 – Michelle Conn, field hockey player
May 25 – Mike Myers, actor, comedian, screenwriter and film producer
May 26 – Richard Crouse, film critic
June – Laureen Harper, wife of Prime Minister Stephen Harper
June 4 – Carey Nelson, long-distance runner
June 6 – Bernard Drainville, Canadian journalist and politician
June 17 – Sandra Greaves, judoka
June 24 – Barbara Underhill, pairs figure skater and World Champion
June 25 – Doug Gilmour, ice hockey player and coach
June 25 – Yann Martel, author

July to September
July 11 – Al MacInnis, ice hockey player
July 11 – Sandra Schmirler, curler, Olympic gold medallist and World Champion (d. 2000)
July 12 – Andy Savoy, politician and engineer
July 28 – Gregory Henriquez, architect
August 2 – Russell Smith, novelist and newspaper columnist
August 8 – Stephen Walkom, ice hockey official and executive
September 2 – Gerard Gallant, ice hockey player and coach
September 7 – Karen Dianne Baldwin, Miss Universe 1982  
September 9 – Kathryn Johnson, field hockey player
September 25 – Karin Larsen, synchronized swimmer and broadcaster
September 29 – Dave Andreychuk, ice hockey player

October to December

October 20 – Julie Payette, astronaut
November 19 – Bill Dunlop, boxer
November 22 – Benoît Sauvageau, politician (d. 2006)
November 23 – Troy Hurtubise, inventor and conservationist (d. 2018) 
November 25 – Holly Cole, jazz singer
December 4 – Robert Dawson, wrestler
December 9 – Dave Hilton, Jr., boxer
December 29 – Liisa Savijarvi, alpine skier
December 30 – Michelle Douglas, human rights activist

Deaths
March 27 – Gaspard Fauteux, politician, Speaker of the House of Commons of Canada and Lieutenant-Governor of Quebec (b.1898)
May 12 – Robert Kerr, sprinter and Olympic gold medallist (b.1882)
June 23 – Herbert Alexander Bruce, surgeon and 15th Lieutenant Governor of Ontario (b.1868)
August 19 – Kathleen Parlow, violinist (b.1890)
September 8 – Leslie Gordon Bell, politician and lawyer (b.1889)

Full date unknown
Murdoch Mackay, politician (b.1884)

See also
 1963 in Canadian television
 List of Canadian films

References

 
Years of the 20th century in Canada
Canada
1963 in North America